The Oklahoma Office of Management and Enterprise Services (OMES) is a government agency which manages and supports the basic functioning of the government of Oklahoma. Under the leadership of the Oklahoma Secretary of Agency Accountability, OMES provides financial, property, purchasing, human resources and information technology services to all state agencies, and assists the Governor of Oklahoma on developing the annual state budget. Originally called the Office of State Finance, the agency was renamed to its current name in 2012.

The Office is headed by a director who is appointed by the governor with the approval of the Oklahoma Senate, to serve at the pleasure of the governor. Within the office is the state's chief information officer, who is also appointed by the governor, who oversees the state's information technology systems.

The current OMES director is John Suter, who was named interim director by Governor Kevin Stitt in October 2022 after previous director Steven Harpe was appointed to lead the Oklahoma Department of Corrections.

The Office of Management and Enterprise Services was created in 2012 during the term of Governor Mary Fallin.

Overview

History
The Office of State Finance was created in 1947 by Governor of Oklahoma Robert S. Kerr to replace the State Budget Office.

In April 2010, Governor Brad Henry appointed the Oklahoma's first chief information officer following legislation passed in the last session of 2009 modernizing Oklahoma's state government information technology system. Part of the CIO's responsibilities is to identify synergies possible through the reduction of duplicate systems and centralizing IT infrastructure.

The Office of State Finance was significantly reformed in 2011 when Governor Mary Fallin signed the Government Administrative Process Consolidation and Reorganization Reform Act of 2011. Pursuant to that Act, several agencies were consolidated into OSF, including the Oklahoma Department of Central Services, the Oklahoma Office of Personnel Management, the Oklahoma State Employees Benefits Council, and the Oklahoma State and Education Employees Group Insurance Board. All the powers and duties of those agencies were vested in the director of OSF and the individual agencies became subsidiary divisions of the OSF, which was renamed the Office of Management and Enterprise Services.

External links
Official Oklahoma Office of Management and Enterprise Services website
Link to House Bill 1304
Link to House Bill 2140 Consolidation Report
State CIO Salaries Information
Recovery.org - Oklahoma Office of Management and Enterprise Services Award Information
Capgemini Assessment of Oklahoma
Capgemini Information

Finance, Office of State
Government agencies established in 2011